Monika Schwarz-Friesel (born November 28, 1961 in Bensberg) is a German cognitive scientist, professor at the Technical University of Berlin and one of Europe’s most distinguished antisemitism researchers according to Marc Neugröschel from the newspaper The Times of Israel. She is often interviewed by media outlets like Haaretz, Der Standard or Der Tagesspiegel on her research on current forms of antisemitism, which often take place on the internet.

Education
Schwarz-Friesel studied German and English philology and psychology at the University of Cologne. In 1990 she received her doctorate in Cologne on the subject of "Cognitive Semantics and Neuropsychological Reality" and completed her habilitation in 1998 on the subject of "Indirect Anaphora in Texts".

Academic career
Schwarz-Friesel established the approach of critical cognitive linguistics in Germany. From 2000 to 2010 she taught as a university professor for text linguistics and pragmatics at the Institute for German Linguistics at the University of Jena. Since 2010 she has held a professorship at the Technical University of Berlin.

Her research focuses on the interaction of language, cognition and emotion, cognitive semantics and metaphors, and verbal manifestations of current antisemitism.

She advises institutions on current forms of antisemitism, e.g. the platform StopAntisemitismus.de which was established in 2019 by the ZEIT-Stiftung. Also, she is the Chairperson of the Board of Trustees of the Leo Trepp Foundation.

When the Simon-Wiesenthal-Prize of the Austrian Parliament was established in 2020 by the President of the National Council, Wolfgang Sobotka, she became a member of the expert jury. The Simon-Wiesenthal-Prize is awarded by the National Fund of the Republic of Austria for Victims of National Socialism for outstanding civic engagement to combat antisemitism and promote Holocaust education.

Personal life
Monika Schwarz-Friesel is married to the historian Evyatar Friesel.

Awards and honors 
 On May 5, 2022, she gave the commemoration speech on antisemitism and culture of remembrance in the Austrian Parliament in the Vienna Hofburg.
 She received an honorary doctorate for outstanding scientific achievements from the University of Debrecen on November 29, 2014.
 Schwarz-Friesel held the Rabbi-Brandt-Lecture of the Deutscher Koordinierungsrat on November 11, 2013 on the topic “The language of antisemitism”.

Selected publications

References 

1961 births
Living people
Scientists from North Rhine-Westphalia
21st-century German women scientists
Academic staff of the Technical University of Berlin
German cognitive scientists
University of Cologne alumni
People from Bergisch Gladbach
Academic staff of the University of Jena
Scholars of antisemitism